Maarja is an Estonian feminine given name. It is considered to be the Estonian form of the name Maria (and therefore Mary). The name is common in Estonia, and may refer to any of the following persons:
Maarja-Liis Ilus (born 1980; sometimes known as just "Maarja"), singer
Maarja Jakobson (born 1977), actress
Maarja Kangro (born 1973), poet, short story writer and librettist
Maarja Kivi (born 1986; also known as "Marya Roxx"), singer
Maarja Kruusmaa (born 1970), computer scientist and professor 
Maarja Nummert (born 1944), architect 
Maarja Nuut (born 1986), singer and violinist
Maarja Saulep (born 1991), footballer

See also
Maarja-Magdaleena, village in Tabivere Parish, Jõgeva County
Väike-Maarja, settlement in Väike-Maarja Parish, Lääne-Viru County
Marja (disambiguation)

References

Estonian feminine given names